Kovalevich is a Slavic surname used in Russian and Ukrainian (spelled Ковалевич, Kovalevich), Belarusian (spelled Кавалевіч, Kavalevich), and Polish (spelled Kowalewicz) cultures.

The surname may refer to:
 Nadezhda Kovalevich (born 1969), Soviet sprint canoer
 Igor Kovalevich (born 1968), Belarusian football coach
 Benjamin Kowalewicz (born 1975), a Canadian singer

See also
 
 Kovacevich, a surname
 Kovachevich, a surname

Russian-language surnames
Ukrainian-language surnames